Promerycochoerus ("Before Merycochoerus" or "Before Ruminating Hog") is an extinct genus of hippopotamus-like oreodont artiodactyl that lived in Central North America during the Early Miocene.

The 1 m (3 ft 4 in) long creature is thought to have been amphibious, as all species possessed an elongated, barrel-shaped body and short limbs that are typical adaptations found in semi-aquatic mammals. P. superbus had a long tapir-like face, while P. carrikeri had a short, somewhat pig-like face.

References

Oreodonts
Miocene mammals of North America
Miocene even-toed ungulates
Miocene genus extinctions
White River Fauna
Fossil taxa described in 1858
Prehistoric even-toed ungulate genera